Chërnyy Island is a small island lying  south of the eastern tip of Thomas Island in the Highjump Archipelago. It was mapped from air photos taken by U.S. Navy Operation Highjump (1946–47). It was rephotographed by the Soviet expedition (1956) and named Ostrov Chërnyy (black island).

See also 
 List of antarctic and sub-antarctic islands

References 

Islands of Wilkes Land